Caroline St-Hilaire (born November 16, 1969 in Longueuil, Quebec) is a Canadian politician, who served as Mayor of Longueuil under the banner of Action Longueuil from November 10, 2009 to November 5, 2017. She was previously a Member of Parliament, representing the Bloc Québécois for the riding of Longueuil—Pierre-Boucher.

In 2022, she ran as a Coalition Avenir Québec candidate in Sherbrooke for the provincial election, and lost to incumbent MNA Christine Labrie.

Member of Parliament (1997–2008) 
St-Hilaire was re-elected in the 2000 Canadian federal election and again in the 2004 Canadian federal election. She served as the Bloc's Deputy House leader from 2000 to 2004 and has served as the critic to the Status of Women, Amateur Sport, Persons with Disabilities and critic to the Minister of Transport. Her committee duties included the Government Operations and Estimates Committee as well as the Commons SubCommittee on International Human Rights where she served as the Vice Chair. In the 38th Parliament she served as the Vice Chair of the House Transport Committee.

An administrator, consultant and executive manager, she was first elected to the House of Commons of Canada in the 1997 Canadian federal election. She is a mother of two, Étienne and Louis-Félix.

On January 14, 2008 St-Hilaire announced she would not be seeking re-election in the 2008 election. The MP told a news conference in Longueuil she was looking forward to spending more time with her children. She said her partner, Bloc Québécois MP Maka Kotto's decision to run for the Parti Québécois in a provincial by-election played a role in her decision.

Mayor of Longueuil (2009–2017) 
On November 1, 2009, St-Hilaire was elected as mayor of Longueuil for the first time, defeating Jacques Goyette of the ruling Parti municipal Longueuil. She is also the current leader of the Longueuil municipal political party Action Longueuil.

St-Hilaire has expressed a strong dislike of the use of English in Longueuil council meetings and would like Bill 101 amended to prevent its use.

On July 1, 2016, St-Hilaire was expected to make a speech at the annual Canada Day parade in the Longueuil borough of Greenfield Park however she failed to show up. St-Hilaire is known for being an advocate for Quebec sovereignty.<ref
name=StHilaireANoShowCanadaDay></ref>

Electoral record (incomplete)

References

External links 
 
 Personal website

1969 births
Bloc Québécois MPs
Women members of the House of Commons of Canada
French Quebecers
Living people
Mayors of Longueuil
Members of the House of Commons of Canada from Quebec
Université du Québec à Montréal alumni
Women mayors of places in Quebec
21st-century Canadian politicians
21st-century Canadian women politicians
Quebecor people